Rose Schnitzer Tower is a high-rise apartment building in Portland, Oregon.

References

External links
 

Buildings and structures in Portland, Oregon
Southwest Portland, Oregon